The Cat Who Came for Christmas is the first book in a trilogy written by Cleveland Amory, an American author who wrote extensively about animal rights. Amory recounts his rescue and adoption of Polar Bear, a cat he featured in two future books. It was first published by Little, Brown and Company in 1987 and then in paperback by Penguin Books in 1988.

Plot summary 
Amory, a writer and animal rights activist (but not a cat person), finds a stray cat while walking down an alley one snowy Christmas Eve. Amory takes the cat to his apartment and acclimates him to living indoors. Polar Bear meets a number of Amory's celebrity friends and acquaintances, including Cary Grant, Walter Cronkite, and George C. Scott. Amory also details his animal rights work at the time.

Reception 
Kirkus Reviews wrote that the book was "utterly delightful and humorous, and a treasure for anyone who's ever been 'owned by a cat.'"

Publishers Weekly wrote: "Amory offers an entertaining, if precious, re-creation of his first year with Polar Bear (his account of selecting a name takes 20 pages)."

Mary Daniels in Chicago Tribune wrote, "Amory makes seamless transitions between what might otherwise be unrelated material by using Polar Bear as a sub-theme throughout the book."

The first edition was #8 on the New York Times bestseller list on November 29, 1987. It spent 20 weeks on the list. The 1988 paperback edition was #3 on the New York Times bestseller list on October 30, 1988. It reached #1, remaining in that place for 5 weeks. New York Times listed it as the #5 top paperback nonfiction book of 1988. The paperback returned to the New York Times bestseller list in fall 1988 at #3, the next month reaching #1.

Audiobook, sequels, and combined edition 
The audiobook is read by Alan Sklar.

The Cat Who Came for Christmas has two sequels:

 The Cat and the Curmudgeon. Little, Brown & Company, 1990. 
 The Best Cat Ever. Little, Brown & Company, 1993. 

The three books were published in one volume in 1995 under the title The Compleat Cat.

1987 books
Books about animal rights

References 

Non-fiction books
Books about cats
American memoirs